Senator Scudder may refer to:

Edward W. Scudder (1822–1893), New Jersey State Senate
Zeno Scudder (1807–1857), Massachusetts State Senate